The 1998 California Attorney General election occurred on November 3, 1998. The primary elections took place on June 3, 1998. The Democratic nominee, Bill Lockyer, defeated the Republican nominee, Dave Stirling, for the office previously held by incumbent Dan Lungren, who chose not to seek re-election in favor of running for governor.

Primary results
Final results from the Secretary of State of California.

Democratic

Candidates 

 Bill Lockyer, State Senator
 Lynn Schenk, Former U. S. Representative
 Charles M. Calderon, State Senator
 Michael Schmeier

Republican

Candidates 

 M. David "Dave" Stirling, Attorney, Former Assemblyman and candidate in 1982
 Mike Capizzi

Peace & Freedom

Others

General election results
Final results from the Secretary of State of California.

Results by county
Results from the Secretary of State of California:

See also
California state elections, 1998
California Attorney General
List of attorneys general of California

References

External links
VoteCircle.com Non-partisan resources & vote sharing network for Californians
Information on the elections from California's Secretary of State

Attorney General
1998
California